"Red in the Face" is the seventh episode of the first season of the American television drama series Mad Men. It was written by Bridget Bedard and directed by Tim Hunter. The episode originally aired on the AMC channel in the United States on August 30, 2007.

Plot
It's Thursday and the members of Sterling Cooper have weekend plans. Roger's wife and daughter are going out of town so he tries to go away with Joan, but she already has plans. Peggy, who has been gaining weight, is going to work on copy for Belle Jolie. Pete (whom Roger calls "Paul" to annoy him) is taken aback to learn that Peggy is working on copy, and assumes it must be a woman-related account, such as sanitary napkins. He offers to take a look at her copy, untruthfully claiming copywriters have him do it all the time. Flattered, she agrees.

Roger, lonely, insists Don go out drinking with him, and Roger flirts with some women at the bar, musing that girls lose their glow when they turn 30. He then discovers the young women aren't looking at him but Don. Roger invites himself to dinner with Don and Betty, with Betty skipping her entrée so that Roger can eat it. After dinner, Roger drunkenly makes a move on Betty when Don leaves the room. After Don returns, Roger leaves, and Don angrily turns on Betty and says she was leading Roger on by being talkative at dinner. Don calls her "a little girl", echoing Betty's psychiatrist earlier in the episode, who has paternalistically been sharing everything said in Betty's sessions with Don. He commented of Betty that "basically, we're dealing with the emotions of a child". The next day, Roger attempts to apologize to Don, but Don feigns ignorance.

Meanwhile, Pete attempts to return a "chip-and-dip" that he and Trudy received as a wedding present, claiming that they were given two by mistake. At the department store, Pete feels emasculated when he is unable to charm the store employees into giving him a cash refund. He uses his store credit to purchase a rifle instead. Later, it is revealed that Trudy did not want him to return the chip-and-dip, and is furious with Pete. The next day, Pete brings the rifle to work and shows it to Peggy. He tells her about a fantasy he has in which he uses the rifle to kill a deer, then drag it to a cabin in the woods where a woman cooks it for his dinner and watches him eat it.

Betty has a chance encounter with Helen Bishop at the supermarket. Helen angrily confronts Betty about the lock of hair she gave to Glen, telling her that it was "inappropriate" for a 9-year-old. Betty responds by slapping her in the face. Later, Francine tells Betty that the other housewives are on Betty's side, and they agree to shun Helen.

Meanwhile, Don plots his revenge on Roger for making a pass at Betty. Don takes Roger to a lunch of oysters and martinis in preparation for a meeting with executives from Richard Nixon's campaign. Before they leave the building, Don bribes an elevator attendant. At lunch, Don pushes Roger to eat and drink more and more. When they return to the office, the attendant tells them that the elevator is out of service, so they must walk the 23 flights of stairs to the office. Roger becomes exhausted and vomits in front of the men from the Nixon campaign. Don asks if Roger is okay, then walks away smirking to himself.

Reception
The episode was received positively by critics. Alan Sepinwall, writing for New Jersey's The Star-Ledger, wrote that the episode captured the generational divide of the era. Andrew Johnston, writing for Slant Magazine, praised the episode's sense of humor. Emily VanDerWerff of The A.V. Club graded it an "A" (the highest possible), praising its "audacious character writing."

References

External links
"Red in the Face" at AMC

Mad Men (season 1) episodes
2007 American television episodes